Molla Arreh (also Romanized as Mollā Arreh, Mollā Areh, and Mollā-ye Areh; also known as Mol Yareh and Mulla Areh) is a village in Famur Rural District, Jereh and Baladeh District, Kazerun County, Fars Province, Iran. At the 2006 census, its population was 1,105, in 256 families.

References 

Populated places in Kazerun County